The 2015 Transnistrian census was organized in the unrecognized state of Transnistria in 2015. It was held after Moldova, internationally recognized as the owner of the state's territory, made a census in 2014.

Census results
According to the census results, Transnistria's population was of 475,373 people in 2015. This represented a population decline of 14.47% (or nearly 80,000 people) since the 2004 Transnistrian census, which is an amount similar to the population of the second largest Transnistrian-controlled city, Bender (Tighina).

The ethnic composition results were the following:
 Russians: 29.1%
 Moldovans: 28.6%
 Ukrainians: 22.9%
 Bulgarians: 2.4%
 Gagauz: 1.1%
 Belarusians: 0.5%
 Transnistrians: 0.2%
 Others: 1.4%

This census was the first one in Transnistria in which the population was given the option to identify as "Transnistrian", which more than 1,000 people did. Furthermore, 14% of the population did not specify its ethnic affiliation.

See also
 1989 Transnistrian census
 2004 Transnistrian census
 Demographic history of Transnistria
 2014 Moldovan census

References

External links
 Preliminary results of the census
 Official results

Censuses in Transnistria
Transnistria
2015 in Transnistria
Transnistria